Edward Norman Dancer FAA (born 29 December 1946, Bundaberg, Queensland, Australia) is an Australian mathematician, specializing in nonlinear analysis.

Dancer received in 1969 a Bachelor of Science with Honours (BSc (Hons)) from the Australian National University and in 1972 a PhD from the University of Cambridge with thesis advisor Frank Smithies and thesis Bifurcation in Banach Spaces. As a postdoc Dancer was from 1971 to 1972 at the University of Newcastle-upon-Tyne, UK and from 1972 to 1973 at the Institute of Advanced Studies at the Australian National University. At the University of New England in New South Wales, he was from 1973 to 1975 a lecturer, from 1976 to 1981 a senior lecturer, from 1981 to 1987 an associate professor, and from 1987 to 1993 a full professor. From 1993 to the present, he has been a full professor and chair of the school of mathematics and statistics at the University of Sydney.

Dancer is also a part time professor at Swansea University.

Honours and awards
 1996 — elected a Fellow of the Australian Academy of Science (FAA)
 2002 — Humboldt Research Award received from the Humboldt Foundation and Helmholtz Association
 2009 — Hannan Medal awarded by the Australian Academy of Science
 2010 — Invited Speaker at the International Congress of Mathematicians in Hyderabad
 2017 — Schauder Medal

Selected publications

with Ralph S. Phillips: 

with Peter Hess: 

with Shusen Yan: 
with Yihong Du: 
with Juncheng Wei and Tobias Weth: 
with Kelei Wang and Zhitao Zhang:

References

20th-century Australian mathematicians
21st-century Australian mathematicians
Fellows of the Australian Academy of Science
Mathematical analysts
Dynamical systems theorists
Australian National University alumni
Alumni of the University of Cambridge
Academic staff of the University of New England (Australia)
Academic staff of the University of Sydney
1946 births
Living people